Angustalius malacellus is a moth of the Crambinae family. It is known from Spain, Portugal, France, Sardinia, Sicily, Italy, Greece and Crete. It has also been recorded from the Comoros, Rwanda, South Africa, Ethiopia, Madagascar, La Réunion, Mauritius and Fiji.

The larvae feed on grasses, but have been reported feeding on maize plants, causing severe damage.

References

External links
Swedish Museum of Natural History - images of the type of Crambus hapaliscus

Crambinae
Moths of Europe
Moths of the Comoros
Moths of Fiji
Moths of Madagascar
Moths of Africa
Moths of Asia
Moths described in 1836
Moths of Mauritius
Moths of Réunion